

The Bernard SIMB AB 14 was a 1920s French single-seat sesquiplane fighter aircraft designed and built by the Société Industrielle des Métaux et du Bois (SIMB). With a reluctance of the French authorities to purchase monoplanes the Bernard 14 was designed as a sesquiplane with Y-form struts bracing the wings on each side. It was powered by a Hispano-Suiza 12Hb inline piston engine and had a fixed tailskid landing gear. While on a test flight on 22 February 1926 the aircraft suffered a catastrophic structural failure of the upper wing and the only Bernard 14 was destroyed.

Specifications

Notes

Bibliography

External links

Bernard 14

1920s French fighter aircraft
AB014
Sesquiplanes